Desmodium paniculatum, the panicled-leaf ticktrefoil, narrow-leaf tick-trefoil or panicled tickclover, is a perennial herb in the pea family, Fabaceae. Belonging to a nearly cosmopolitan genus, the panicled-leaf ticktrefoil is  a common native to Eastern North America, ranging from Quebec to Florida and as far West as Texas, Nebraska, and Ontario. The sticky loment can be found in disturbed areas that receive plenty of light, such as roadsides, parks, and abandoned fields.

Description
Desmodium paniculatum grows to 3 feet tall in an erect and spreading habit with alternate, pinnately-trifoliolate leaves.  The leaves are lanceolate to oblong and are usually 2 to 10 times as long as wide.  The pedicels are around 1 cm. The flowers of the paniculate inflorescence are light pinkish to lavender and appear June through September. The sticky loments that many people find attached to their shoes and pants are arranged in a row of 2-6 superiorly sinuate and inferiorly triangular segments and appear August–October.

Uses
While this species hasn't been tested for medically or commercially beneficial compounds like other species of Desmodium, studies have shown the value of this species, as well as other legumes, as a native forage for pasture use.  While not as easily digestable and protein-rich as some non-native legumes and grasses, the panicled-leaf ticktrefoil can be a good source of protein-based fodder for livestock during the warmer months of the year.

References

paniculatum
Flora of the United States